Men at Work is a 1990 American action  comedy thriller film written and directed by Emilio Estevez, who also starred in the lead role. The film co-stars Charlie Sheen, Leslie Hope and Keith David. The film was released in the United States on August 24, 1990.

Plot
Carl Taylor and James St. James, a pair of garbage collectors who dream of owning a surf shop, are known for being troublemakers during work by tossing garbage cans in the street and making noise that disturbs residents. A local bike cop, Mike, hassles them frequently, but Carl and James are used to his bullying and shrug it off. After completing their shift, they are put on probation for their disruptive antics and told they are to be accompanied by an observer on their next shift: their supervisor's brother-in-law, Louis.

After work, the pair use a telescope to spy on Susan Wilkins, a woman living across the street, and watch as she is mistreated by a man. Once she leaves the room, Carl, in a form of payback, shoots the man in the rear with a pellet gun. As James and Carl hide and laugh, two men enter Susan's apartment, strangle the man and drag him away. After stuffing his body into a barrel, they put the barrel in their car, but it falls out and is found the next day by Carl, James and Louis on their garbage route. Carl and James panic when they realize that not only is the dead man the same person Carl shot in Susan's apartment, but that he is also Jack Berger, a city councilman who was running for mayor. Louis, a semi-crazed no-nonsense Vietnam War vet, calms the two down by explaining that Jack died of strangulation, not being shot.

Louis, demanding that the cops not get involved, takes control of the situation by having them stash the body at Carl's place. When Carl sees Susan come home, he decides to meet her and goes over to her apartment building. They hit it off and spontaneously go for a night drive. Meanwhile, Louis makes their problems worse when he kidnaps a pizza delivery man who sees James with the body. James tries to call the police, but Louis unplugs the phone and drags James, the pizza guy, and the body into a car to follow Carl and Susan.

While in pursuit of Carl and Susan, they are pulled over by Mike and his partner Jeff. Louis, using the pellet gun and the pizza guy as a hostage, forces Mike and Jeff to drop their guns before handcuffing them together in a compromising position at a playground. Meanwhile, Carl and Susan are discovered and kidnapped by Biff and Mario, the hitmen who had killed Jack. The two are brought before Maxwell Potterdam III, a corrupt businessperson who has been dumping toxic waste illegally. Jack had been covering for him but, when he tried to back out, Maxwell had him killed. Carl and Susan are then stuffed into cans and set to be disposed of in a lake Potterdam is using as an illegal dump site. Carl's barrel falls off the truck and he is freed; he and James manage to grab onto the truck carrying Susan while Louis, the pizza guy, and Jack's body follow in a rent-a-cop car.

Carl frees Susan and the group neutralizes Potterdam's squad of goons, terrorize him with their pranks —and Jack's body— and then throw him in the toxic water.

Cast
 Charlie Sheen as Carl Taylor
 Emilio Estevez as James St. James
 Keith David as Louis Fedders
 Leslie Hope as Susan Wilkins
 Dean Cameron as Pizza Delivery Man
 John Getz as Maxwell Potterdam III
 Hawk Wolinski as Biff
 John Lavachielli as Mario
 Geoffrey Blake as Frost
 Cameron Dye as Luzinski
 John Putch as Officer Mike
 Tommy Hinkley as Officer Jeff
 Darrell Larson as Jack Berger
 Sy Richardson as Walt Richardson
 Kari Whitman as Judy
 Troy Evans as Captain Leo Dalton
 Jim "Poorman" Trenton as Narrator
 Brad Wyman as Rent-a-Cop
 Matt Robinson as Rent-a-Cop
 Bob Brown as Henchman #1
 Erik Stabenau as Henchman #2
 Bobby Burns as Henchman #3
 Eddie Braun as Henchman #4

Production

Development
The original screenplay was tentatively titled Clear Intent and was written in the mid-1980s. Estevez came up with the idea while he was filming the 1985 movie St. Elmo's Fire.

"I was living in a studio apartment in Santa Monica at the time, and I was up late one night sitting at the kitchen table working out some story ideas on my computer. All of a sudden, this trash truck came roaring down the alley under my window. It was 5 a.m. and it just struck me -- no one had ever done a movie about trashmen before."

It was slated to star another Brat Packer alongside Estevez, such as Judd Nelson.

At one stage, John Hughes was going to be producer or director, according to Estevez. "When I was reading it, I thought it was so good, so close to my bone, that I had written it", said Hughes. "Emilio wants to direct it, and I'm sure he will be able to. He can do anything. He can act, he can write, he can direct. He's surpassed me in that respect. I can't act--I wish I could."

Estevez wound up writing 15 different drafts of the film. He said he had no intention of using his brother in the movie, but Sheen said he wanted in after reading the script. "He felt he needed a comedy at this point of his career", Estevez said.

Estevez eventually raised funds from Epic Pictures, which provided the $9 million for the film.

The film's title was changed to Pop 65 then to Men at Work.

Shooting
Most of the movie was shot in Redondo Beach and Hermosa Beach in California.

Charlie Sheen said his brother "was great.. . . He knew me too well. He'd say, 'Dude, let's get real here.' I respect the hell out of Emilio. He's very tai chi when it comes to directing."

Estevez says he wanted his brother to "sort of push the envelope and play the humor. He has a wonderful sense of humor, which hasn't really been put on film yet – up to now. Charlie has a very dry sense of humor, very cynical. And out of that comes some great, great humor."

Filming started in March 1989. The studio disliked the original ending; shooting the new one resulted in ten additional days of filming. Estevez edited the film while making Young Guns II during the day.

Estevez later said "For me to be able to do a movie where saving the environment is the underlying theme is the greatest contribution I can make, I think. More people are going to see what I'm doing in a film and be educated through entertainment than if I show up at a rally. I'm working on putting the causes I think we need to address into my work and into the projects I choose."

Reception
Considering its relatively small production budget, Men at Work did well in theaters, grossing US$16,247,964, with $3,184,311 of that grossed within the first week.

The critical reception for the film was negative. Men at Work currently holds a 32% rating on Rotten Tomatoes based on 28 reviews.

Soundtrack
Men at Work (Rhino/Wea, July 18, 1990)

"Wear You to the Ball" – UB40
"Super Cool" – Sly & Robbie
"Big Pink House" – Tyrants in Therapy
"Feeling Good" – Pressure Drop
"Back to Back" – Blood Brothers
"Take Heed" – Black Uhuru
"Here and Beyond" – Sly & Robbie
"Truthful" – Blood Brothers
"Reggae Ambassador" – Third World
"Give a Little Love" – Ziggy Marley & the Melody Makers
"Playas Dawn" – Stewart Copeland
"Pink Panther No. 23" – Stewart Copeland

References

External links

 
 
 
 

1990 films
1990 action comedy films
1990s black comedy films
American action comedy films
American comedy thriller films
American independent films
American buddy comedy films
Films about organized crime in the United States
Films directed by Emilio Estevez
Films set in Los Angeles
Films shot in California
Triumph Films films
Films scored by Stewart Copeland
1990s buddy comedy films
1990 independent films
1990s English-language films
1990s American films